Bishtinovo (Biştin) is a rural locality (a village) in Ilikovsky Selsoviet, Blagoveshchensky District, Bashkortostan, Russia. The population was 169 as of 2010. There are 7 streets.

Geography 
Bishtinovo is located 55 km northeast of Blagoveshchensk (the district's administrative centre) by road. Bayturovo is the nearest rural locality.

References 

Rural localities in Blagoveshchensky District